Jason Paul Taylor (born September 1, 1974) is an American former professional football player who was a defensive end and outside linebacker in the National Football League (NFL), spending the majority of his career with the Miami Dolphins. Taylor is currently the defensive line coach of the Miami Hurricanes. Over the course of his 15-year career, Taylor played for the Dolphins in three stints (1997–2007, 2009 and 2011), and also played a season each for the Washington Redskins (2008) and New York Jets (2010).

Taylor was a four-year letterman and three-year starter for the Akron Zips of the University of Akron before being drafted in the third round, 13th pick (73rd overall), in the 1997 NFL Draft by Miami. 

Taylor is ranked first in Dolphins history for the most games played by a defensive player in team history, with 204 games (including a defensive team record 130 consecutive games), and is also the Miami Dolphins all-time sack leader with 131 sacks. Overall, Taylor is 7th on the all-time career sack list with 139.5 sacks. Taylor has the 4th most forced fumbles of all time with 46, and is the all-time leader in fumble return touchdowns with six, and interceptions returned for touchdowns by a defensive lineman with three, while his 246 fumble return yards are the 4th-highest total in NFL history. With nine career defensive touchdowns scored, he is also the all-time leader in that category for defensive linemen. He officially announced his retirement on December 28, 2011.

Taylor won the Dolphins Team Newcomer of the Year award during his rookie season in 1997, and throughout his career with the Dolphins won numerous team awards including a team record four Dolphins Team MVP awards (2000, 2002, 2004, 2006), and a team record four Dolphins Team Leadership Awards (2002, 2006-2007, 2009). Along with being a six-time Pro Bowl selection, four-time first (3) or second (1) team All-Pro, and a two-time NFL Alumni Defensive Linemen of the Year (2005-2006), Taylor was a two-time AFC Defensive Player of the Year (2002, 2006), and was named the NFL Defensive Player of the Year in 2006. He was named the NFL Walter Payton Man of the Year in 2007, and was also selected to the NFL 2000s All-Decade Team.  

In 2017, Taylor was inducted into the Pro Football Hall of Fame, in his first year of eligibility.

Early years
Jason Taylor grew up around Pittsburgh, Pennsylvania, and played high school football for Woodland Hills High School. He was homeschooled from grades 10 through 12.

College career
While attending the University of Akron, Taylor was a four-year letterman and three-year starter for the Akron Zips football team. He recorded 279 tackles, 21 sacks, seven fumbles recovered, and three interceptions in his college career. He was a two-time first-team All-Mid-American Conference selection as a junior and senior, as well as an All-America pick as a junior. As a junior, he played weakside linebacker and moved to left defensive end as a senior. In 1996, he earned National Defensive Player of the Week honors for his performance against Virginia Tech when he posted 12 tackles, two sacks, two fumble recoveries, three stops for loss and tackled a punt returner in the end zone for a safety.

Taylor also started for the Akron Zips men's basketball team.  In 2004, he became the third person ever inducted into Akron's Ring of Honor.  He majored in political science and criminal justice.

Professional career

First stint with Dolphins
Taylor was drafted by the Miami Dolphins in the third Round (73rd pick overall) of the 1997 NFL Draft. Taylor signed a four-year deal worth approximately $1.3 million in July 1997.  From there he established himself as one of the premier defensive ends in the league. He became a starter in his rookie season and recorded five sacks and forced two fumbles.

The following season, 1998, Taylor recorded nine sacks and batted away eight passes. In 1999 Taylor grabbed the first of his eight career NFL interceptions.

2000–2003
On April 15, 2000, Taylor, a restricted free agent, received a one-year tender that earned him $1.027 million in 2000. Taylor responded with 73 tackles, 14.5 sacks, and 6 passes batted for the Dolphins that season. His performance was rewarded with his first selection to the Pro Bowl.

On July 24, 2001, he signed a six-year, $42 million contract to remain with the Dolphins. The new contract replaced the one-year, $5.39 million deal the Dolphins tendered Taylor in February 2001, when he was designated their franchise player. In 2001 Taylor recorded 70 tackles (15 for a loss), 8.5 sacks and swatted away eight passes.

In 2002, Taylor led the NFL and tied the Dolphin team record for sacks with 18.5. He also forced seven fumbles and knocked down eight more passes to go with his 69 tackles. He was a consensus All-Pro selection and returned to the Pro Bowl. The next season (2003) Taylor followed up his All-Pro performances with a 13-sack season.

2004–2005
On March 1, 2004, the Dolphins, in an effort to create more salary cap space, agreed to a three-year contract extension with Taylor. The extension put Taylor under contract through the 2009 season. The new deal (which replaced his 6-year, $42 million contract that was scheduled to expire in 2006) was worth $45 million over the 2004-2009 seasons, including nearly $10 million guaranteed in 2004. In 2004 Taylor had 68 tackles, 9.5 sacks, batted 11 passes and picked off a pass. He followed that up with a 73-tackle, 12-sack showing in 2005.  He also knocked down 10 passes and forced four fumbles.

2006
Taylor enjoyed one of the best years of his career in 2006 when he recorded 13.5 sacks, 9 forced fumbles, 2 fumble recoveries, and two interceptions (both of which were returned for touchdowns), an effort which resulted in his selection as the 2006 NFL Defensive Player of the Year. On January 5, 2007, Taylor received 22 votes from a panel of 50 sportswriters and broadcasters who cover the NFL. Taylor beat Denver Broncos cornerback Champ Bailey, who received 16 votes. Shawne Merriman received six votes, and the winner of the award in 2005, Brian Urlacher of the Chicago Bears, received four votes.  Taylor was also named a consensus All-Pro for the second time in his career.

2007
In 2007 Taylor reached double-digits in sacks for the sixth time in his career and picked off another pass (the 7th of his career, and the 3rd returned for a TD). Five of his FRs he has returned for TDs, which is an NFL record shared with former Atlanta Falcons linebacker Jessie Tuggle. With eight career defensive TDs (three on INT returns, five on FR returns), Taylor became the all-time leader in defensive touchdowns scored by a defensive lineman. He has also registered two career safeties and has two career field goal blocks.

In 2007 Taylor was voted to the All-time Miami Dolphins team in a poll of Dolphins fans. He was a First-team selection at defensive end along with Bill Stanfill.

Washington Redskins

Miami Dolphins General Manager Jeff Ireland admitted that there were trade discussions regarding veteran defensive end Taylor.  Jacksonville Jaguars coach Jack Del Rio acknowledged speaking to the Dolphins about Taylor, "They had a certain price in mind and nobody in the league was interested in that price".  On Monday April 28, 2008, The Miami Herald reported that Dolphin President Bill Parcells was displeased that Taylor skipped the Dolphins voluntary off-season workouts to be on Dancing with the Stars and that when "Taylor walked into a room where Parcells was watching tape, and Parcells ignored him".  Taylor was reportedly "incensed".  Ireland, on Sunday, April 27, 2008, said that the Dolphins want Taylor back for the 2008 season and regard him as a team leader.

On Saturday, April 26, 2008, The St. Petersburg Times reported that the Tampa Bay Buccaneers had agreed to trade at least a second round pick, and perhaps others, to the Dolphins for Taylor.  However, when the second round pick was traded to Jacksonville, the paper removed the story from its website.  Buccaneers coach Jon Gruden, when asked about trade talks stated, “There have been some trade rumors and I don’t think we’re any different than anybody else.  When you’re talking about high-profile players, we’re going to pick up the phone and see what’s going on. It’s part of our job.”

On July 20, 2008, Taylor was traded to the Washington Redskins for a second-round pick in 2009 (Pat White was selected with the pick) and a sixth-round pick in 2010.  The trade came after the Redskins lost two defensive ends - Phillip Daniels and Alex Buzbee - to season-ending injuries on the first day of training camp.

On March 2, 2009, Taylor was released by the Washington Redskins for refusing to participate in off-season conditioning programs after claiming he wanted to be closer to his family in Florida.

Second stint with Dolphins

On May 13, 2009, Taylor signed a one-year deal with the Miami Dolphins for $1.1 million with $400,000 in incentives. On November 1, Taylor set the NFL record for most fumble returns for a touchdown with a 48-yard return against the Dolphins' rivals, the New York Jets, and extended his NFL record of most defensive touchdowns scored by a defensive lineman with 9 (6 on fumble returns, 3 on interception returns). In a game against Tampa Bay, Taylor also recorded his 8th and final career interception, which is second all-time for a defensive lineman.

New York Jets
Taylor signed with the New York Jets on April 20, 2010, to a two-year contract worth up to $13 million with $2.5 million guaranteed. On September 19, 2010, he sacked New England Patriots quarterback Tom Brady, giving him 128.5 sacks in his career, the 10th-most in NFL history. With 132.5 sacks at the end of the regular season, he was tied for 8th most sacks in a career with Hall of Fame linebacker Lawrence Taylor and defensive end Leslie O'Neal. On January 23, 2011, Taylor played in his first Conference Championship game in his 14-year career and recorded 2 tackles while the Jets lost, 24–19, against the Pittsburgh Steelers, falling one game short of the Super Bowl for the second straight year.

After one season with the Jets, Taylor was released on February 28, 2011.

Third stint with Dolphins

On August 1, 2011, Taylor signed with the Miami Dolphins for a third stint. During a loss to the Philadelphia Eagles Jason Taylor sacked Michael Vick twice giving him seven sacks on the year, and also giving him the sixth-most sacks in NFL history with 139.5, just ahead of Hall of Famers John Randle and Richard Dent.

Retirement and broadcasting career
On December 28, 2011, Taylor announced that he would retire at the end of the 2011 season. He played his final game on January 1, 2012, in a 19–17 win against his former team the New York Jets. In the game Taylor nearly returned a fumble for a touchdown, before the score was overruled. After the game ended, Taylor was ceremoniously carried off the field by his teammates. Jason retired 6th on the NFL's all time sack list with 139.5 sacks, along with 47 career forced fumbles, 29 fumble recoveries with an NFL Record six returned for TDs, and eight career interceptions with three returned for TDs. With nine career defensive touchdowns, he is the NFL's all time leader in that category for defensive linemen.

Taylor appeared as a guest analyst for NFL Live on June 6, 2011. On June 6, 2012, it was announced that he would join ESPN as an analyst to contribute to NFL Live, SportsCenter, NFL32 and Sunday and Monday NFL Countdown. Taylor is a board member of NFL Foundation.

On October 14, 2012, Taylor along with his teammate Zach Thomas, together became the 23rd and 24th members to be inducted into the Miami Dolphins Honor Roll.

On February 4, 2017, Taylor was elected to the Pro Football Hall of Fame in his first year of eligibility, becoming the 10th "long time" Miami Dolphin to enter Canton, and the fifth Miami Dolphin (joining Jim Langer, Paul Warfield, Don Shula and Dan Marino) to do it his first year of eligibility.

Awards
Taylor has won numerous awards throughout his career, including the 2006 NFL Defensive Player of the Year award, two AFC Defensive Player of the Year awards (2002, 2006), and the 2007 Walter Payton Man of the Year Award, the only league honor that recognizes both on-field achievements and off-the-field contributions.  Taylor is also a six-time Pro Bowl selection (2000, 2002, 2004–2007), a four-time First or Second-team All-Pro (2000–2002, 2006), a two-time NFL Alumni Association Defensive Lineman of the Year (2005, 2006), and the NFL Alumni Association Pass Rusher of the Year (2000).

Taylor has also won the "AFC Defensive Player of the Week" Award seven times which is fifth most ever by a defensive player, for the following performances:
 10/13/02 vs. Denver: 5 tackles, 2 sacks, 1 FF
 12/15/02 vs. Oakland: 8 Tackles, 3 Sacks, 2 FFs
 11/23/03 vs. Washington: 9 Tackles, 2 Sacks
 11/28/04 vs. San Francisco: 7 Tackles, 3 Sacks, 1 FF, 1 FR
 11/27/05 vs. Oakland: 6 Tackles, 3 Sacks, 1 FF, 1 FR, 1 Safety
 11/5/06 vs. Chicago: 3 Tackles, 1 Sack, 1 FF, 1 INT returned for a TD
 11/19/06 vs. Minnesota: 4 Tackles, 1 Sack, 2 FFs, 1 INT returned for a TD

Along with winning seven "AFC Defensive Player of the Week" Awards, Taylor has won three "NFC/AFC Defensive Player of the Month" Awards, which is the third most ever by a defensive player (trailing only Bruce Smith and John Randle) for the following performances:
 October 2002 - 15 tackles, 4 sacks, 2 FFs
 November 2002 - 15 tackles, 5.5 sacks, 1 FF
 November 2006 - 9 tackles, 2 sacks, 3 FFs, 2 INTs returned for TDs, 1 blocked FG

Taylor has also won numerous team awards, including the Dolphins Newcomer of the Year Award (1997), the "Dan Marino" Team MVP Award a record four times (2000, 2002, 2004, 2006), and the "Don Shula" Team Leadership Award four times (2002, 2006-2007, 2009).

NFL career statistics

Dancing with the Stars

 Week 1: Taylor and partner Edyta Sliwinska performed the foxtrot and received a score of 22 out of 30 from the judges.
 Week 2: Taylor and Sliwinska's Mambo received a score of 27. They were asked to perform the encore on the results show.
Week 3: Taylor's Jive garnered a score of 23 from the judges.
Week 4: Taylor and Sliwinska danced a Viennese Waltz.
Week 5: Tonioli and Taylor performed a Rumba, scoring a 27.
Week 6: Taylor and Sliwinska danced the Cha-cha-cha and scored a 24.
Week 7: First, Taylor danced the Quickstep to a score of 29, then he and Sliwinska danced the Paso Doble to the NFL Monday Night Football theme for a score of 26. The combined score of 55 was tops among all dancing duos for Week 7. They were asked to perform their Quickstep as an encore on the results show.
Week 8: Taylor and Sliwinska first danced the Tango and scored a 29. Then they danced the Samba and scored a 23 for a total score of 52.
Week 10: Taylor and Sliwinska danced and got their first perfect score 30/30 as they finished runner-up to winners Kristi Yamaguchi and Mark Ballas.

Performances

Charity work
In 2004 Taylor and his wife Katina founded the Jason Taylor Foundation with the goal of improving the lives of children in South Florida. The foundation has launched the Jason Taylor Reading Room, an after-school program aimed at increasing literacy among inner city children; renamed the Holtz Children's Hospital's learning center as "The Jason Taylor Children's Learning Center"; provided 11 sixth-grade students with college scholarships through the Take Stock in Children organization; created the "Big Screens-Big Dreams" program to screen inspirational films for hundreds of student-athletes; and furnished 60 children with $300 back-to-school shopping certificates as part of the "Cool Gear for the School Year" program.

Taylor has also partnered with the Invicta Watch Group and its CEO, Eyal Lalo, on a number of charitable ventures and was given the opportunity to create a collection of limited edition of watches. He said, "As a watch enthusiast and collector, I am excited to be partnering with Invicta on the development and launch of my collection of watches."

Personal life
Taylor married Monica Taylor on August 18, 2020; they became engaged on July 2, 2019. Taylor and Monica are expecting their first child together, a baby boy due August 2021. Taylor and his ex-wife Katina, who is the sister of Taylor's former teammate Zach Thomas, have three children: sons Isaiah and Mason, and daughter Zoe. Katina filed for divorce twice in 2006, citing irreconcilable differences and asking for custody of the children, but withdrew the petitions both times. The couple quietly divorced in Key West, Florida in 2015. Taylor lives in the Fort Lauderdale suburb of Plantation. Taylor's sister Joy Taylor is the former news anchor on The Herd with Colin Cowherd on Fox Sports 1. His son, Mason, plays college football at LSU.

Coaching career
Jason Taylor coached at St. Thomas Aquinas High School (Florida) for five years from 2017-2021, his first three as the team's defensive line coach, and his last two as the team's defensive coordinator. During Taylor's tenure, St. Thomas Aquinas High School won three consecutive state championships from 2019-2021. They won their fourth consecutive state title in 2022 after Taylor left the team to join the University of Miami (FL).  In 2022, Taylor made the jump to collegiate coaching, joining Mario Cristobal's staff at the University of Miami (FL) as a defensive analyst.

References

External links
Miami Dolphins bio
Washington Redskins bio
New York Jets bio

1974 births
African-American players of American football
Akron Zips football players
American Conference Pro Bowl players
American football defensive ends
American football outside linebackers
Living people
Miami Dolphins announcers
Miami Dolphins players
National Football League announcers
New York Jets players
Participants in American reality television series
Players of American football from Pittsburgh
Washington Redskins players
Pro Football Hall of Fame inductees
21st-century African-American sportspeople
20th-century African-American sportspeople
100 Sacks Club
National Football League Defensive Player of the Year Award winners